VGP Universal Kingdom is an amusement park located in East Coast Road in Chennai, Tamil Nadu, India. The park offering small rides during the early days of its history became a full-fledged amusement park in 1997. VGP Universal kingdom, spread over 44 verdant acres provides several fun and adventure rides for children, youth and adults, including Attractions such as our very own Statue Man, Tamil Nadu's first Snow park, Petting Zoo, Beach Live Shows, Paneer fort, a massive water complex and more. VGP 2000 millennium tower, Water cascades, Paneer fort and statueman are some of the main attractions. The park is owned by VGP Group of Companies founded by V. G. Panneerdas and V.G.Ravidas is its managing director.
Food and drink are available within the park.

VGP Universal Kingdom now has two other entertainment zones nearby it, which have been recently developed.

See also 
Tourism in Chennai
East Coast Road

References 

https://www.vgpmarinekingdom.in/ by Praveetha

https://www.snowkingdom.com/chennai/ by Praveetha

External links 
Official website of VGP Universal Kingdom
VGP Universal Kingdom Entry Fee, Timings, Reviews
 A new thriller at VGP
VGP Extreme Stunt Show

Amusement parks in Chennai
Water parks in India
1997 establishments in Tamil Nadu
Amusement parks opened in 1997